Frances E. Willard School is an elementary school located in the Port Richmond neighborhood of Philadelphia, Pennsylvania. It is part of the School District of Philadelphia. The school is named for suffragist Frances Willard.

The original school building was designed by Henry deCoursey Richards and built in 1907–1908. It is a four-story, three-bay, "E"-shaped, brick clad concrete building in the Classical Revival style. It features limestone trim, a -story overscale arched opening, and brick parapet. The building was added to the National Register of Historic Places in 1987.

In 2010, the school moved into a new building on Elkhart Street, just north of the old building.

References

External links

School buildings on the National Register of Historic Places in Philadelphia
Neoclassical architecture in Pennsylvania
School buildings completed in 1908
1908 establishments in Pennsylvania
Public elementary schools in Philadelphia
School District of Philadelphia